Ian McMahon (born 7 October 1964) is an English footballer who played as a midfielder in the Football League.

Work in England
McMahon worked at various professional football clubs in administrative capacities following his early retirement from the sport due to a knee injury. These included Hull City and Doncaster Rovers. He is also the author of a book detailing his season at Doncaster, called The Only Way is Up. He was also involved with Rugby clubs, such as Oldham R.L.F.C.

Move to the US
Following his season at Doncaster Rovers, McMahon was recruited to the Des Moines Menace, helping to establish their youth academy. From Des Moines he moved to West Michigan Edge, taking a similar stance on youth development. McMahon was then involved with the foundation of the West Michigan Fire Juniors following talks with Chicago Fire and then became head coach of the West Michigan Firewomen. McMahon then worked at Fort Wayne Fever as the chief executive officer. He later became commissioner of Women's League Soccer in 2011, where he described his job as being "to help teams grow on and off the field and help attract fans".

Hong Kong
He worked as a general manager of the Hong Kong Rugby Football Union from May 2011 until June 2013. He said of his new job that "everywhere you look, we have seen progress. We have to continue to grow the game, but at the same time set realistic goals and objectives". Whilst there he witnessed the first time that rugby players were named on the Hong Kong honours list. He resigned due to the difficulty in moving his family.

Personal life
McMahon is married to Elise and has two children, Connor and Nolan.

References

External links
Ian McMahon's Career
AYSO 

1964 births
Living people
English footballers
People from Wells, Somerset
Association football midfielders
Oldham Athletic A.F.C. players
Rochdale A.F.C. players
English Football League players